Cattleya dowiana is a species of orchid. The diploid chromosome number of C. dowiana has been determined as 2n = 40; the haploid chromosome number has been determined as n = 20.

References

External links

dowiana
dowiana